The 1998–99 Argentine Primera División was the 108th season of top-flight football in Argentina. The season ran from August 7, 1998, to June 21, 1999. Both main clubs from Córdoba, Talleres (champion of 1997–98 Primera B Nacional) and Belgrano (winner of "Torneo Reducido", after beating Aldosivi in a two-legged series) were promoted from Primera B Nacional.

Boca Juniors won both, Apertura and Clausura championships (a total of 24 league titles to date), while Platense and Huracán were relegated with the worst points averages.

Torneo Apertura

League standings

Top scorers

Torneo Clausura

League standings

Top scorers

Relegation

See also
1998–99 in Argentine football

References

Argentine Primera División seasons
1
Argentine
Argentine